Jordan Alejandro Díaz Fortún (born 23 February 2001) is a Cuban-born Spanish triple jumper.

Career
He won the gold medal at the 2017 World Youth Championships, the 2018 World U20 Championships, the 2018 NACAC Championships, the silver medal at the 2018 Central American and Caribbean Games and won the gold medal at the Youth Olympic Games in 2018.

His personal best jump is 17.87 metres, achieved in June 2022 in Nerja. At the 2017 World Youth Championships he jumped 17.30 metres, a new championship record and world under-18 best mark, improving it further in 2018.

On 28 June 2021, he defected from the Cuban delegation sent to a preparatory competition in Castellón, Spain. He thus missed the Tokyo Olympics. He began to train under Iván Pedroso in Guadalajara. Shortly after acquiring Spanish citizenship in 2022, Díaz beat the country's triple jump record.

References

External links
 

2001 births
Living people
Cuban male triple jumpers
Spanish male triple jumpers
Athletes (track and field) at the 2018 Summer Youth Olympics
Athletes (track and field) at the 2019 Pan American Games
Pan American Games silver medalists for Cuba
Pan American Games medalists in athletics (track and field)
World Athletics U20 Championships winners
Youth Olympic gold medalists for Cuba
World Youth Championships in Athletics winners
Medalists at the 2019 Pan American Games
Central American and Caribbean Games medalists in athletics
Competitors at the 2018 Central American and Caribbean Games
Central American and Caribbean Games silver medalists for Cuba
Youth Olympic gold medalists in athletics (track and field)
Defecting sportspeople of Cuba